Korgalzhyn is a lake in Korgalzhyn District, Akmola Region, Kazakhstan.

Korgalzhyn is one of the main lakes of the Tengiz-Korgalzhyn Depression. The lake is part of the Korgalzhyn Nature Reserve, a  protected area. It is also an Important Bird  Area and Ramsar site with its wetlands and mostly muddy waterways which are the breeding site of 318 bird species, including 22 endangered birds.

Geography
Korgalzhyn is a lake that lies at the bottom of the large Tengiz-Korgalzhyn Depression, close to the southeast of larger Lake Tengiz. Lake Sholakshalkar lies to the east. Most of it is covered by reeds, except for a few lobes in the northwest and northeast, Kokai, Sultankeldy and Isey, where the surface is relatively free of vegetation. The lake bottom is flat and clayey, covered with dark grey silt.

The Nura river flows into the eastern lakeshore from the northeast. During spring floods the overflow discharges into lake Tengiz from the northwestern end. River Kulanotpes flows along the western end of Korgalzhyn. The water of the lake is fresh near the mouth of the Nura, becoming increasingly brackish towards the northern sector.

Flora and fauna
There are large reed beds scattered on mud islands almost completely covering the southern part with a mesh of open channels and ponds in between. Owing to these mud islands Korgalzhyn is an important wetland site for migratory water birds, such as different species of gulls, terns, ducks and grebes, including the northernmost colony of greater flamingo. The reed thickets also provide a habitat for the wild boar.

Unlike barren neighboring lake Tengiz, Korgalzhyn is abundant in fish fauna. The main species in the lake are crucian carp, mirror carp, tench, ide, pike and perch.

See also
 List of lakes of Kazakhstan
 Saryarka – Steppe and Lakes of Northern Kazakhstan

References

External links
 Ecotourism Information Resource Centre - Northern Kazakhstan
 Korgalzhyn Nature Reserve, Kazakhstan

Lake groups of Kazakhstan
Endorheic lakes of Asia
Akmola Region
Tengiz basin
Important Bird Areas of Kazakhstan
Ramsar sites in Kazakhstan